The Tenth Amendment of the Constitution Bill 1986 (bill no. 15 of 1986) was a proposed amendment to the Constitution of Ireland to remove the prohibition on divorce. The proposal was rejected in a referendum on 26 June 1986. It was the first of two referendums held in Ireland on the question of divorce; the Fifteenth Amendment in 1995 allowed for divorce under specified conditions.

Background
The Constitution of Ireland adopted in 1937 included a constitutional ban on divorce. The prohibition reflected the religious values of the document's Catholic drafters, but was also supported by senior members of the Anglican Church of Ireland. In the 1930s, some other countries had similar bans, such as Italy, which would not repeal its ban until the 1970s. By the 1980s, however, many saw the prohibition on divorce as illiberal or as discriminating against those who did not share the Christian attitude to divorce. An Oireachtas Joint Committee on Marital Breakdown was established in 1983, which reported in 1985. It made recommendations on such matters as mediation, judicial separation, child custody, and barring orders; regarding divorce, it recommended that a referendum be held but did not agree on a yes vote.

Proposed changes to the text
Tenth Amendment of the Constitution Bill proposed to delete the following Article 41.3.2º of the Constitution:

and to substitute that subsection with the following:

Oireachtas debate
A private member's bill by Labour Party government backbencher Mervyn Taylor to remove the ban on divorce, Tenth Amendment of the Constitution (No. 2) Bill 1985, was defeated in Dáil Éireann on 26 February 1986 by 54 votes to 33.

On 14 May of the same year, Minister for Justice Michael Noonan introduced the Tenth Amendment of the Constitution Bill 1986 on behalf of the Fine Gael–Labour Party government of Garret FitzGerald. It passed the Dáil on 21 May and the Seanad on 24 May.

Campaign
The amendment was supported by government parties Fine Gael and Labour as well as the Workers' Party. It was opposed by Fianna Fáil, the main opposition party, by the Catholic Church and by conservative groups.

Result

Aftermath
The Judicial Separation and Family Law Reform Act 1989, enacted three years after the referendum, had been initiated as a private member's bill by Fine Gael backbencher Alan Shatter. This allowed for separation to be recognised by the courts, without the right to remarry.

The Fifteenth Amendment of the Constitution Act 1995 was proposed by Mervyn Taylor, now as Minister for Equality and Law Reform, which again proposed to allow for divorce in certain circumstances. It was narrowly passed by referendum on 24 November 1995 with 50.3 of the vote.

Sources
Primary

References

External links
 Oireachtas debates on the bill
 Text of the bill (PDF) as voted in the referendum

1986 in Irish law
1986 in Irish politics
1986 referendums
Divorce law
Family law in the Republic of Ireland
10
Marriage in Ireland
10b
June 1986 events in Europe
Amendment, 10, 1986
Divorce referendums
Religious controversies in Ireland